Xylosma molesta is a species of flowering plant in the family Salicaceae. It is endemic to New Caledonia.

References

molesta
Endemic flora of New Caledonia
Vulnerable plants
Taxonomy articles created by Polbot
Plants described in 1974
Taxa named by Hermann Otto Sleumer